John Henry Robinson Molson (June 5, 1826 – May 28, 1897) was a Canadian entrepreneur and philanthropist. He was an owner of Molson Brewery and president of Molson Bank.

Born June 5, 1826 to Thomas Molson (1791–1863) and Martha Molson (1795–1848) at Kingston, Upper Canada, "Jackey", as he was affectionately known, was educated in Montreal public schools. Inheriting the Molson Brewery in 1847 under the terms of his grandfather's will, he became associated with its management. In 1852 he entered into partnership with his father to conduct their separately owned brewing and distilling enterprises. Operations were continued after 1863 by John H.R. Molson and other brothers. On the retirement of John Thomas Molson in 1866, distilling was abandoned but the brewery continued under John H.R. Molson and Adam Skaife. In 1879 Molson was made a director of Molson Bank and was forthwith elected vice-president, and later president, 1889-97. Other interests included the Montreal Street Railway, the City and District Bank and the Scottish Life Assurance Co. He was a life governor of the Montreal General Hospital, a generous benefactor of McGill University and a founder of the Verdun Protestant Hospital for the Insane.

In 1873 John was wed to Louisa Goddard Frothingham (1827–1910), daughter of hardware entrepreneur, John Frothingham. John & Louisa had no children. John died in 1897 at Montreal from nephritis. In 1897, there were no crematoriums in Canada. John's body was sent to Boston for cremation. His ashes were later placed in the Molson family vault at Mount Royal Cemetery. In his will, John left $10,000 to Mount Royal Cemetery with his instructions: "For the erection and workings of a crematory furnace for the cremation of the dead."

References

External links
Memorial at Find A Grave

1826 births
1897 deaths
Businesspeople from Ontario
People from Kingston, Ontario
John Henry Robinson Molson
19th-century American businesspeople